Henrik Morén (5 January 1887 – 31 January 1956) was a Swedish cyclist. He competed in two events at the 1912 Summer Olympics.

References

External links
 

1887 births
1956 deaths
Swedish male cyclists
Olympic cyclists of Sweden
Cyclists at the 1912 Summer Olympics
People from Växjö Municipality
Sportspeople from Kronoberg County
20th-century Swedish people